Not Before Time is a collection of science fiction short stories by John Brunner, published in 1968.

Contents

 Prerogative
 Fair Warning
 The Warp and the Woof-Woof
 Singleminded
 A Better Mousetrap
 Coincidence Day
 Seizure
 Treason is a Two-Edged Sword
 Eye of the Beholder
 Round Trip

References

1968 short story collections
Short story collections by John Brunner